Dylan Riley (born November 17, 1986 in Thousand Oaks, California) is an American soccer player currently playing for Stallion FC in the United Football League.

Career

College and Amateur
Riley attended Thousand Oaks High School, and played four years of college soccer at California State University, Northridge, where he was a regular in the soccer team between 2006 and 2009.

During his college career and beyond, Riley played with USL Premier Development League club Ventura County Fusion, from 2007 through to the end of 2010. He was part of the Fusion team which won the 2009 USL PDL national championship.

Professional
Riley signed his first professional contract in March 2011, joining USL Pro club Wilmington Hammerheads. He made his professional debut on April 17, 2011 in Wilmington's first game of the 2011 season, a 1-0 win over the Rochester Rhinos. Riley re-signed with Wilmington for the 2012 season on December 7, 2011.

References

External links
 Cal State profile

1986 births
Living people
American soccer players
Cal State Northridge Matadors men's soccer players
Ventura County Fusion players
Wilmington Hammerheads FC players
Soccer players from California
USL League Two players
USL Championship players
Expatriate footballers in the Philippines
Stallion Laguna F.C. players
Association football defenders